Qian Zhongshu (November 21, 1910 – December 19, 1998), also transliterated as Ch'ien Chung-shu  or Dzien Tsoong-su, was a renowned 20th century Chinese literary scholar and writer, known for his wit and erudition.

He is best known for his satirical novel Fortress Besieged. His works of nonfiction are characterized by large amount of quotations in both Chinese and Western languages such as English, German, French, Italian, Spanish, and Latin. He also played an important role in digitizing Chinese classics late in his life.

Qian created a profound theoretical meaning for the three features of motivational nature, empathetic nature, and rational nature of aesthetic emotion for literature by deeply studying questions such as the source of emotion motivation, the ways to express emotion, and the optimal comfort in emotion in writing. He believed that the source of emotion motivation is poems because poems can convey human's emotion. When people transfer their emotion to inanimate objects, they give these objects life, which is the ways to express emotion. Also, Qian insisted that humans cannot express their emotion as they want; instead, they should rationally control their emotion to a certain degree so that they can achieve an optimal appreciation status.

Life
Most of what is known about Qian's early life relies on an essay written by his wife Yang Jiang. Born in Wuxi, Qian Zhongshu was the son of Qian Jibo (T: ,), a conservative Confucian scholar, landed gentry, and Chinese language professor at Tsinghua, St. John's University, and National Central University (Nanking), respectively. By family tradition, Qian Zhongshu grew up under the care of his eldest uncle, who did not have a son. Qian was initially named Yangxian ("respect the ancients"), with the courtesy name Zheliang ("sagacious and upright"). However, when he was one year old, in accordance with a tradition of zhuazhou, practiced in many parts of China, he was given a few objects laid out in front of him for his "grabbing"; he grabbed a book. His uncle thusly renamed him Zhongshu, literally "fond of books," while Yangxian became his intimate name. Qian was a rather talkative child. His father later changed his courtesy name to Mocun, literally "to keep silent," in the hope that he would talk less.

Both Qian's name and courtesy name forecasted his future life. While he remained talkative when talking about literature with friends, he kept silent most of the time on politics and social activities. Qian was indeed very fond of books. When he was young, his uncle often brought him along to teahouses during the day. There, Qian was left alone to read storybooks on folklore and historical events, which he would repeat to his cousins upon returning home.

At the age of 6, Qian went to Qinshi primary school and stayed home for less than half a year due to illness. At the age of 7, Qian studied in a private school of a relative's family. Due to inconvenience, he quit school a year later and was taught by his uncle. When Qian was 11, he entered the first grade at Donglin Elementary School, and his uncle died this year. He continued living with his widowed aunt, even though their living conditions drastically worsened as her family's fortunes dwindled. Under the strict tutelage of his father, Qian mastered classical Chinese. At the age of 14, Qian left home to attend Taowu middle school,an English-language missionary school in Suzhou, after being scolded by his father, he studied hard and improved his writing level. In 1927, Qian was admitted to Furen Middle School, an English-language Missionary School in Wuxi, where he manifested his talent in language. At the age of 20, Qian's aunt died.

Despite comparatively lower score in mathematics, Qian excelled in both Chinese and English languages. Thus, he was accepted into the Department of Foreign Languages of Tsinghua University in 1929, ranking 57 out of 174 male students. One of his few friends was the budding Sinologist and comparatist Achilles Fang. Qian also frequently cut classes, though he more than made up for this in Tsinghua's large library, which he boasted of having "read through." It was probably in his college days that Qian began his lifelong habit of collecting quotations and taking reading notes. At Tsinghua, Qian studied with professors, such as Wu Mi 吳宓, George T. Yeh (Yeh Kungchao 葉公超), and Wen Yuan-ning 溫源寧, Wen Yuan-ning, and others. In 1932, he met Yang Jiang, who became a successful playwright and translator. In 1933, Qian became engaged to Yang, and they married in 1935. For the biographical facts of Qian's following years, the two memoirs by his wife can be consulted.  Yang Jiang wrote, "Zhongshu's 'foolishness' could not be contained in books, but just had to gush forth'". Two years after Qian graduated from Tsinghua University in 1933, Qian taught at Kwanghua University in Shanghai and contributed to English-language publications such as The China Critic.

In 1935, Qian received a Boxer Indemnity Scholarship to further his studies abroad. Together with his wife, Qian headed for the University of Oxford in Britain. After spending two years at Exeter College, Oxford, he received a Baccalaureus Litterarum (Bachelor of Literature). Shortly after his daughter Qian Yuan (T: ,) was born in England in 1937, he studied for one more year in the University of Paris in France. In 1938, he returned to China and was appointed as a full professor at Tsinghua University, which, due to the war, had relocated to Kunming, in Yunnan province and become part of Southwestern United University. In 1939, after Qian returned to Shanghai to visit his relatives, he directly went to Hunan to take care of his sick father and temporarily left Southwestern United University. In 1941, During the Pearl Harbor incident, Qian was temporarily trapped in Shanghai.

Owing to the unstable situation during the Second Sino-Japanese War and the Chinese Civil War, Qian did not hold any long-term jobs. However, it was during the late 1930s and 1940s that he wrote most of his Chinese-language fiction, including Fortress Besieged and the story collection Human, Beast, Ghost, as well as the essay collection Written in the Margins of Life. After Japan's defeat, in the late 1940s, he worked in the National Central Library in Nanjing, editing its English-language publication, Philobiblon.

In 1949, Qian was ranked on the list of National First-class Professors (T: ,) and commenced his academic work in his alma mater. Four years later, an administrative adjustment saw Tsinghua changed into a science and technology-based institution, with its Arts departments merged into Peking University (PKU). Qian was relieved of teaching duties and worked entirely in the Institute of Literary Studies (T: ,) under PKU. Qian is a senior researcher at the institute, and his wife Yang Jiang is also a researcher. He also worked as part of a small team in charge of the translation of Mao Zedong's Selected Works and poetry.

During the Cultural Revolution, like many other prominent intellectuals of the time, Qian suffered persecution. Appointed to be a janitor, he was robbed of his favorite pastime, reading. Having no access to books, he had to read his reading notes. He began to form the plan to write Guan Zhui Bian (T: ,) (which Qian himself gave the English title of Limited Views) during this period. Qian, his wife, along with their daughter survived the hardships of Cultural Revolution, but their son-in-law, a history teacher, was driven to suicide.

After the Cultural Revolution, Qian returned to research. From 1978 to 1980, he visited several universities in Italy, the United States and Japan, impressing his audience with his wit and erudition. In 1982, he was instated as the deputy director of the Chinese Academy of Social Sciences. He then began working on Guan Zhui Bian, which occupied the next decade of his life.

While Guan Zhui Bian established his fame in the academic field, his novel Fortress Besieged introduced him to the public. Fortress Besieged was reprinted in 1980, and became a best-seller. Many illegal reproductions and "continuations" followed. Qian's fame rose to its height when the novel was adapted into a TV serial in 1990 which was acted by some famous Chinese actors, such as Daoming Chen and Da Ying.

Qian returned to research, but escaped from social activities. Most of his late life was confined to his reading room. He consciously kept a distance from the mass media and political figures. Readers kept visiting the secluded scholar, and an anecdote goes that Qian when approached by a British admirer, remarked: "Is it necessary for one to know the hen if one loves the eggs it lays?"

Qian entered a hospital in 1994, his daughter also became ill in 1995. On March 4, 1997, Qian's daughter died of cancer. On December 19, 1998, Qian died in Beijing.

Former Residence 
Qian's former residence, covering 1,600 square meters, is located at Xinjiexiang #30 and #32 in Wuxi, Nanjing. It was built in 1923 by his grandfather Qian Fujiong. In 1926 his uncle Qian Sunqin built five buildings and several auxiliary rooms on the west side of the back of the house, covering an area of 667.6 square meters. The whole group of buildings are typical Jiangnan courtyard houses. Inside the residence, there are some unique separate buildings, such as Haixu Shulou and Meihua Shuwu. In 2018, it applied for China's significant cultural relics protection units. The former residence has related exhibitions and is open to the public without fees.

Pictures of Qian's former residence

Works
Qian lived in Shanghai from 1941 to 1945, which was then under Japanese occupation. Many of his works were written or published during this chaotic period of time. A collection of short essays, Written in the Margins of Life (Traditional: ,) was published in 1941. Human, Beast, Ghost (T: ,), a collection of short stories, mostly satiric, was published in 1946. His most celebrated work Fortress Besieged (T: ,) appeared in 1947, but not until 1980s that it receives more attention. On the Art of Poetry (T: ,), written in classical Chinese, was published in 1948.

Besides rendering Mao Zedong's selected works into English, Qian was appointed to produce an anthology of poetry of the Song dynasty when he was working in the Institute of Literary Studies. The Selected and Annotated Song Dynasty Poetry (T: ,) was published in 1958. Despite Qian's quoting the chairman, and his selecting a considerable number of poems that reflect class struggle, the work was criticized for not being Marxist enough. The work was praised highly by the overseas critics, though, especially for its introduction and footnotes. In a new preface for the anthology written in 1988, Qian said that the work was an embarrassing compromise between his personal taste and the prevailing academic atmosphere.

Seven Pieces Patched Together (T: ,), a collection of seven pieces of literary criticism written (and revised) over years in vernacular Chinese, was published in 1984, and has been translated by Duncan Campbell as Patchwork: Seven Essays on Art and Literature. This collection includes the famous essay "Lin Shu's Translation" (T: ,).

Qian's magnum opus is the five-volume Guan Zhui Bian (T: ,), literally the Pipe-Awl Collection, translated into English as Limited Views. Begun in the 1980s and published in its current form in the mid-1990s, it is an extensive collection of notes and short essays on poetics, semiotics, literary history and related topics written in classical Chinese.

Qian's command of the cultural traditions of classical and modern Chinese, ancient Greek (in translations), Latin, English, German, French, Italian, and Spanish allowed him to construct a towering structure of polyglot and cross-cultural allusions. He took a range of Chinese classical texts as the basis of this work, including the I-Ching, Classic of Poetry, Verses of Chu, The Commentary of Tso, Records of the Grand Historian, Tao Te Ching, Lieh-tzu, Jiaoshi Yilin, Extensive Records of the T'ai-p'ing Era and the Complete Prose of the Pre-Tang Dynasties (T: ,).

Broadly familiar with the Western history of ideas, Qian shed new lights on the Chinese classical texts by comparing them with Western works, showing their likeness, or more often their apparent likeness and essential differences.

Qian Zhongshu is one of the best-known Chinese authors in the Western world. Fortress Besieged has been translated into English, French, German, Russian, Japanese and Spanish. It represents an alternative strand of modernism, which has
long remained hidden and unexamined in the history of modern Chinese literature. "Humans, Beasts, and Ghosts" has been translated into English, French, and Italian.

Besides being one of the great masters of written vernacular Chinese in the 20th century, Qian was also one of the last authors to produce substantial works in classical Chinese. Some regard his choice of writing Guan Zhui Bian (Limited Views) in classical Chinese as a challenge to the assertion that classical Chinese is incompatible with modern and Western ideas, an assertion often heard during the May Fourth Movement. Ronald Egan argues that the work contains an implicit negative commentary on the Cultural Revolution.

Posthumous publications
A 13-volume edition of Works of Qian Zhongshu (Traditional: ,) was published in 2001 by the Joint Publishing, a hard-covered deluxe edition, in contrast to all of Qian's works published during his lifetime which are cheap paperbacks. The publisher claimed that the edition had been proofread by many experts. One of the most valuable parts of the edition which demonstrating Qian's writing ability while blending humor and irony, titled Marginalias on the Marginalias of Life (T: ,), is a collection of Qian's writings previously scattered in periodicals, magazines and other books. The writings collected there are, however, arranged without any visible order.

Other posthumous publications of Qian's works have drawn harsh criticism. The official writing of Supplements to and Revisions of Songshi Jishi  began in 1982. In the following ten years, Qian invested a lot of energy to make extensive and in-depth Supplements to and Revisions of Songshi Jishi.  The 10-volume Supplements to and Revisions of Songshi Jishi (T: 宋詩紀事補正, S:宋诗纪事补正), published in 2003, was criticized as a shoddy publication. Liaoning People's Publishing House published Qian Zhongshu's ''Supplements to and Revisions of Songshi Jishi in 2003. A facsimile of Qian's holograph (known as 宋詩紀事補訂() in Chinese) has been published in 2005, by another publisher. The facsimiles of parts of Qian's notebooks appeared in 2004, and have similarly drawn criticism on account of blatant inadvertency. In 2005, a collection of Qian's English works was published. Again, it was lashed for its editorial incompetence.

The Commercial Press (Shangwu yinshuguan) has, per an agreement with Yang Jiang, begun publishing photoreproductions of Qian Zhongshu's reading notes, totaling several score volumes in both Chinese and foreign languages.

See also

List of Chinese authors
Yang Jiang

Notes

Portrait 
 Qian Zhongshu. A Portrait by Kong Kai Ming at Portrait Gallery of Chinese Writers (Hong Kong Baptist University Library).

Further reading
Innumerable biographies and memoirs in Chinese have been published since Qian's death.

Two critical studies of Qian's life and works in English:

Theodore Huters. Qian Zhongshu. Boston: Twayne Publishers, 1981.
Christopher Rea, ed. China's Literary Cosmopolitans: Qian Zhongshu, Yang Jiang, and the World of Letters. Leiden: Brill, 2015.
Literary works by Qian in English translation:
Qian Zhongshu. Jeanne Kelly and Nathan K. Mao, trans. Fortress Besieged. (Bloomington: Indiana University Press, 1979; Reprinted with foreword by Jonathan Spence, New York: New Directions, 2004). 
Qian Zhongshu. Christopher G. Rea, ed. Humans, Beasts, and Ghosts: Stories and Essays. (New York: Columbia University Press, 2011). 
Qian Zhongshu. Duncan M. Campbell, trans. Patchwork: Seven Essays on Art and Literature. (Leiden: Brill, 2014). 
Qian Zhongshu. A Collection of Qian Zhongshu's English Essays. (Beijing: Foreign Language Teaching and Research Press, 2005).

A selected translation of Qian's most celebrated work of literary criticism, Guan Zhui Bian, with critical introduction:

An essay about Qian's critical vision and early writings:
 Christopher G. Rea, "The Critic Eye 批眼"

Five of Qian's essays on poetry in French translation:

External links

 Biographical sketch, some of his works on-line, and a collection of memoirs and essays
 Biographical sketch and chronology of major works
Video: "Who was Qian Zhongshu?"
Video: "The significance of Qian Zhongshu"
Audio lecture: "The power of writing in and from the margins: The literary careers of Qian Zhongshu and Yang Jiang"

 
1910 births
1998 deaths
Alumni of Exeter College, Oxford
Tsinghua University alumni
Academic staff of Tsinghua University
Members of the National Committee of the Chinese People's Political Consultative Conference
Boxer Indemnity Scholarship recipients
Writers from Wuxi
Republic of China novelists
Educators from Wuxi
Republic of China translators
People's Republic of China translators
20th-century Chinese translators
20th-century novelists
Chinese male novelists
Politicians from Wuxi
People's Republic of China politicians from Jiangsu
20th-century male writers
Academic staff of the National Southwestern Associated University
Chinese literary theorists
20th-century Chinese people